Raymond William Westwood (14 April 1912 – 9 December 1981) was an English professional footballer who made over 300 appearances in the Football League for Bolton Wanderers as an inside forward. He was capped by England at international level and represented the Football League XI.

Career
Born in Amblecote, Westwood played professionally for Bolton Wanderers and Chester and made career totals of 339 Football League appearances and 127 goals. He also played non-League football for Stourbridge, Brierley Hill Alliance and Darwen. He won six caps for England and represented the Football League XI.

Personal life
Westwood was the nephew of footballer David Stokes and was the uncle of footballer Duncan Edwards. He served in 53rd (Bolton) Field Regiment, Royal Artillery, during the Second World War.

Honours 
England

 British Home Championship: 1934–35 (shared)

References

1912 births
1981 deaths
English footballers
England international footballers
Stourbridge F.C. players
Brierley Hill Alliance F.C. players
Bolton Wanderers F.C. players
Chester City F.C. players
Darwen F.C. players
English Football League players
Association football inside forwards
English Football League representative players
British Army personnel of World War II
Royal Artillery personnel
People from Dudley
Military personnel from Staffordshire